Mithila Sharma is a Nepalese actress and dancer. She has been acting in Nepali films, tele-serials and dancing at different stage programs and doing various musical dramas. She is known for Mukundo:Mask of Desire (2000), Karma (2006) and Undone by Love (2004). She teaches singing and dancing at Kantishwori and St Mary's High School.

Personal life and education
She was born on 16 October 1963 (30 Ashoj, 2020 BS) in Kathmandu.

Sharma is a graduate in Home Science and Dance who has worked in more than hundred films, more than a dozen serials, several musical dramas and numbers of stage shows. Mithila was married to Ex-IGP of Nepal Moti Lal Bohora in 2014.

Career
Sharma started her career at the age of 9. She performed in Gopal Yonzan's song in front of the late King Birendra on his birthday.

She was first screened in the film Biswas directed by Chetan Karki for a role of a dance teacher which widened her path in the Nepali film industry. Her role as "Gita" in Mask of Desire took her to the international film industry. Her works in films like Mukundo, Sukha Dukha, Didi, Muna Madan, Basai and Afno Manchhe are still well received which are also Sharma's favourites. She has always given preference to the character roles rather than the commercial lead roles in her film career. She also teaches singing and dancing at Kantishwori and St Mary's High School, Jawlakhel, Nepal.

She was one of the judges for the Nepalese reality dance talent show Chham Chhami that aired on Nepal Television.

Filmography 

Mithila Sharma has acted in about 100 movies, more than 25 plays and in more than 200 telefilms. In addition to dancing and acting she has also written and directed 10 musicals.

Film

Television

See also

 Gauri Malla
 Bhuwan Chand

References

Nepal
Living people
1963 births
Khas people
People from Kathmandu
21st-century Nepalese dancers
Nepalese film actresses
Nepalese television actresses
Actresses in Nepali cinema
Actresses in Nepali television